Hameh Kasi, also rendered as Hamakasi, may refer to:
 Hameh Kasi, Bahar, Hamadan Province
 Hameh Kasi, Hamadan
 Qeshlaq-e Hameh Kasi